The Cambridge Centre for Sixth-form Studies (CCSS) was an independent sixth-form college for boarding and day students aged 15 to 19. The college, which was founded in 1980, owned teaching and residential accommodation in the centre of Cambridge, England. It became part of the Stephen Perse Foundation in September 2018 and disappeared as a branded college in March 2020.

Decline and demise

For a number of years prior to its absorption into the Stephen Perse Foundation the college had seen student numbers decline sharply from over 200 to around 135. In response to this fall, the college reduced its staffing, the subjects it offered for study, its extra-curricula activities and closed one of its campuses and its administration block. The college saw a high turnover of staff through redundancies and resignations. These did not cause the hoped for turnaround in the college's financial position and so in 2018 CCSS approached the Stephen Perse foundation to seek admittance. 30 November 2018 was the last day of the college's existence as an independent college.

Notable alumni

Politics 
James Brokenshire, Conservative politician 
Zac Goldsmith, journalist and Conservative politician
Charlie Elphicke, former Conservative politician and convicted criminal

Literature, TV, music, and drama
Hadley Freeman, newspaper columnist and writer 
Daisy McAndrew, television news journalist 
Zoe Hardman, TV presenter and actress   
Tom Wontner, actor; great-grandson of Arthur Wontner  
Giles Lamb, Scottish composer and sound designer
Alex Dolan, journalist and weather presenter on BBC's Look East

External links
 College website

References

Educational institutions established in 1980
1980 establishments in England
Education in Cambridge
Educational institutions disestablished in 2020
2020 disestablishments in England
Defunct schools in Cambridgeshire